The Chungju Dam is a gravity dam on the Namhan River,  northeast of Chungju in Chungcheongbuk-do Province, South Korea. The purpose of the dam is flood control, water supply and hydroelectric power generation. Construction on the dam began in 1978 and was complete in 1985.

See also

List of power stations in South Korea

References

Dams in South Korea
Hydroelectric power stations in South Korea
Gravity dams
Buildings and structures in North Chungcheong Province
Dams completed in 1985
Flood control in South Korea